Kalala Station is a pastoral lease that operates as a cattle station in the Northern Territory of Australia.

Location

Description
In 2019 it was carrying a herd of around 35,000 head of Brahman cattle.

History
The property was acquired by the Langenhoven family in 2019 for $58 million, the family had also recently acquired McMinn Station and the neighbouring Big River Station. The property was sold to them by the Murphy family who had owned it since 2005.

The property was initially established Nelson Bunker Hunt, a Texan billionaire who both owned and operated the station in the 1960s and 1970s. The Beebe brothers, Mick and Roy, acquired the property from Hunt in the late 1970s and made many significant improvements until they sold to the Murphys in 2005 who continued to invest in more infrastructure.

See also
List of ranches and stations

References

Stations (Australian agriculture)
Pastoral leases in the Northern Territory